Simeneh-ye Sofla (also Romanized as Sīmeneh-ye Soflá; also known as Simināh, Sīmīneh, Sīmīneh-ye Pā'īn, and Sīmīneh-ye Soflá) is a village in Mahidasht Rural District, Mahidasht District, Kermanshah County, Kermanshah Province, Iran. At the 2006 census, its population was 202, in 47 families.

References 

Populated places in Kermanshah County